Carlos Velasco Badion (August 16, 1935 – June 20, 2002)  was a Filipino basketball player. Although born in Lubao, Pampanga, he grew up in Tondo, Manila where he started his checkered career playing in sandlot tournaments and for Abad Santos High School in Manila. At 5'11" tall, he was first spotted in an interscholastic tournament by Valerio Lopez of Mapua where he subsequently enrolled. He eventually shone in the NCAA and the MICAA, playing for such teams as the Jacinto Rubber Shoes, Crispa (where he became one of the pioneering members of that team) and YCO.

Known as the "Bad Boy" of Philippine basketball because of his unforgiving and physical defense, Badion popularized the moves that came to be known as the "bicycle drive" and the "jackknife layup," moves which young players tried to imitate during the 1950s. In the commercial leagues, Badion played for the original batch of the Crispa Redmanizers in the Businessman's Athletic Association (BAA) and the YCO Painters in the Manila Industrial Commercial Athletic Association (MICAA).

He starred for the Philippine national team in two Olympic tournaments and the 1958 Asian Games where he and his teammates won the gold medal. He was also a vital cog of the national team that finished seventh in a 15-nation men's basketball tournament in the 1956 Melbourne Olympics, playing alongside the likes of Carlos Loyzaga, Antonio Genato, Ramon Campos Jr., Ramon Manulat, Martin Urra and Mariano Tolentino. Voted Mr. Basketball by the Philippine Sportswriters Association eventually made a movie with the same title together with actor Bob Soler in 1957, Badion was also a mainstay of the team that won the inaugural staging of the Asian Basketball Confederation Championship held in Manila in 1960 together with Loyzaga, Kurt Bachmann, Loreto Carbonell, and Eduardo Lim. He was named to the All-Star team with Loyzaga and Most Valuable Player of the said tournament.

Unfortunately, Badion suffered a serious knee injury during the Philippines' first-round game against Uruguay in the 1960 Rome Olympics which ultimately forced him into early retirement. He then went into a number of business ventures after retiring and even once became the customs coordinator for Elizalde and Company, Inc. He started his coaching in 1975, leading the Mapúa Cardinals to the NCAA title and the UST women’s basketball team to the UAAP title. He also handled the UST Glowing Goldies in the UAAP and the Army Jungle Fighters in the Philippine Basketball League.

Badion died of a heart attack on June 20, 2002.

References

External links
 

1935 births
2002 deaths
Filipino men's basketball coaches
Mapúa Cardinals basketball players
Basketball players at the 1956 Summer Olympics
Basketball players at the 1960 Summer Olympics
Olympic basketball players of the Philippines
People from Tondo, Manila
Sportspeople from Manila
Sportspeople from Pampanga
Basketball players from Metro Manila
Basketball players from Pampanga
People from Pampanga
Kapampangan people
Asian Games medalists in basketball
Basketball players at the 1958 Asian Games
Philippines men's national basketball team players
Filipino men's basketball players
1959 FIBA World Championship players
Crispa Redmanizers players
Asian Games gold medalists for the Philippines
Medalists at the 1958 Asian Games
20th-century Filipino businesspeople
Mapúa Cardinals basketball coaches
UST Growling Tigers basketball coaches